Novoursayevo (Yañı Ursay) is a rural locality (a selo) and the administrative center of Novoursayevsky Selsoviet, Bakalinsky District, Bashkortostan, Russia. The population was 418 as of 2010. There are 6 streets.

Geography 
Novoursayevo is located 37 km west of Bakaly (the district's administrative centre) by road. Muslyuminka is the nearest rural locality.

References 

Rural localities in Bakalinsky District